Paul-Werner Hozzel (16 October 1910 – 7 January 1997) was a ground attack pilot in the Luftwaffe of Nazi Germany during World War II. He was a recipient of the Knight's Cross of the Iron Cross. Following the war, Hozzel joined the Bundeswehr of West Germany and retired as Brigadegeneral.

Early life and career
Hozzel, the son of a shipping broker, was born on 16 October 1910 in Hamburg. In April 1931, following graduation with his Abitur, he volunteered for military service with Artillerie-Regiment 2, an artillery regiment of 2nd Division of the Reichswehr based in Schwerin. On 1 March 1934, Hozzel transferred to the Luftwaffe als Leutnant (second lieutenant).

World War II
At the outbreak of World War II he participated in the Poland campaign in 1939 with the Sturzkampfgeschwaders 1 (StG 1—1st Dive Bomber Wing). This unit also participated in the Battle of France and in the Operation Weserübung. Hozzel was the first Stuka pilot to be awarded the Knight's Cross of the Iron Cross on 8 May 1940. He, Oberleutnant Elmar Schaefer, Leutnant Martin Möbus, and Unteroffizier Gerhard Grenzel, received this award for the destruction of the French destroyer Bison and the British destroyer .

Hozzel was appointed commander of Sturzkampfgeschwader 2 on 16 October 1941. With SG 2, he fought in the Battle of Stalingrad, the Geschwader flew 12,000 combat missions in this engagement.

It was then tasked to form "Gefechtsverband Hozzel" from parts of the Stuka-Geschwaders 1, 2 and 77 participating in the battles around Dnipropetrovsk. Hozzel was awarded the Knight's Cross of the Iron Cross with Oak Leaves on 14 April 1943. He finished the war in a staff position of  Luftflotte 1. He had been tasked with its leadership in the Courland Pocket and went into Soviet captivity as a prisoner of war. He was repatriated on 16 January 1956.

Later in 1956 he joined the Bundeswehr and retired as Brigadegeneral on 30 September 1969.

Awards
 Iron Cross (1939)
 2nd Class (14 September 1939)
 1st Class (5 May 1940)
 Knight's Cross of the Iron Cross with Oak Leaves
 Knight's Cross on 8 May 1940 as Hauptmann and Gruppenkommandeur of the I./StG 1
 230th Oak Leaves on 14 April 1943 Oberstleutnant and Geschwaderkommodore of StG 2 "Immelmann"

References

Citations

Bibliography

External links
 Conference transcript of Paul Werner Hozzel, discussing his war experiences and ground attack tactics, at the National War College USA, November, 1978 transcript

1910 births
1997 deaths
Military personnel from Hamburg
Luftwaffe pilots
German World War II pilots
Recipients of the Knight's Cross of the Iron Cross with Oak Leaves
Brigadier generals of the German Air Force